Radio Raheem is a fictional character in the 1989 film Do the Right Thing produced, written and directed by Spike Lee. The character is played by Bill Nunn. Radio Raheem's name is a reference to the boombox that he carries wherever he goes.

Raheem's death leads to the film's climax, in which tensions between the Brooklyn neighborhood's local Black community and the Italian American owners of a local pizzeria peak. According to Lee, Raheem's death scene was inspired by the Howard Beach racial incident of 1986.

Role 
Radio Raheem is among the wide range of characters that make up the film's Brooklyn neighborhood. Raheem brings his boombox everywhere he goes, playing the song "Fight the Power" by Public Enemy, which also appears in the film's opening scene.

Raheem is quiet through most of the film, but offers key lines that inform major themes of the film. He lives in harmony with the other black locals, but is at odds with other races primarily due to his loud music.

When protagonist Mookie (Lee) runs into Raheem during a pizza delivery, Raheem greets him warmly and explains to him the philosophy behind his "love" and "hate" four fingered ring worn on his right and left hands, respectively.

In response to Sal's restriction of music at his pizzeria, Raheem decides to join Buggin' Out's initiative to boycott Sal's pizzeria. They enter the pizzeria blasting "Fight the Power", repeating the demand that Sal should put black people on his Wall of Fame. In a fit of rage, Sal destroys Radio Raheem's boombox with a baseball bat and calls him a "nigger" after being called a “guinea bastard” by Buggin’ Out. Raheem wrestles Sal to the ground and the fight breaks out into the street. The police arrive and choke Raheem to death.

Symbolism 
In the film Do the Right Thing, Radio Raheem recites a soliloquy on love and hate. In this scene, he is wearing a brass knuckle ring that says “hate” on his left hand and one that says “love” on his right. Lee shoots this scene by having the camera replace the position of Mookie, opposite Raheem. Radio Raheem thus breaks the fourth wall and is speaking directly to the camera and therefore the audience. This deliberate cinematography frames Raheem's monologue as a moment of sincerity and importance. This has the effect of Raheem commenting on black history and the struggle against racism in the real world, on the other side of the camera. Raheem poetically articulates the allure of both love and hate and the constant fluctuation that occurs between these two opposing forces. His monologue can be seen to reveal that the solution to such a nuanced historical issue as racism lies in the combined effort and fluctuation of both forces. This “love/hate” speech is an ode to a similar monologue in the thriller film The Night of the Hunter. In this film, a serial-killer preacher speaks of love and hate as an internal struggle within oneself. Raheem's performance of the same topic, however, is portrayed as an external struggle against the outside world.

Critic Ted Kulczycky comments on Spike Lee's use of direct address in Radio Raheem's soliloquy on love and hate as a "break from realism", thus creating an "atypical effect". Kulczycky cites the influence of Jean-Luc Godard's film Weekend. Kulczycky describes Raheem's direct address as having the dual effect of reminding viewers of the constructed nature of the film, but also "fueling their involvement".

References

Comedy film characters
Drama film characters
Male characters in film
Fictional African-American people
Fictional characters from Brooklyn
Film characters introduced in 1989